is a Japanese actor and voice actor from Aichi Prefecture.

Filmography

Television drama
Shishi no Jidai (1980)
Tōge no Gunzō (1982), Samurai
Nobunaga: King of Zipangu (1992)
Aibō (2006)

Television animation
Yakitate!! Japan (2005), Uncle
Super Robot Taisen OG: Divine Wars (2006), Albert Grey
Golgo 13 (2008), Senator Wilson
Himitsu ~The Revelation~ (2008), Hige Guy
Sōten Kōro (2009), Prisoner

Theatrical animation
Kouchuu Ouja Mushiking: Greatest Champion e no Michi (2005)

Dubbing

Live-action
11.22.63, Al Templeton (Chris Cooper)
Alphas, Dr. Lee Rosen (David Strathairn)
Captain America: The First Avenger, Senator Brandt (Michael Brandon)
Cinderella, Farmer (Paul Hunter)
ER, Rizzo (Glenn Taranto)
The Good Wife, Judge Richard Cuesta (David Paymer)
Harper's Island, Doctor Ike Campbell (Jay Brazeau)
Hemingway & Gellhorn, John Dos Passos (David Strathairn)
Iron Man 3, President Matthew Ellis (William Sadler)
The King's Speech, Prime Minister Neville Chamberlain (Roger Parrott)
The Lone Ranger, Habberman (Stephen Root)
Medium, Mr. Dubois (Bruce Gray)
My Führer – The Really Truest Truth about Adolf Hitler, Adolf Grünbaum (Ulrich Mühe)
Neruda, Arturo Alessandri (Jaime Vadell)
Prison Break, Warden Henry Pope (Stacy Keach)
Rebecca (PDDVD edition), Beatrice's Husband (Nigel Bruce)
Terminator 2: Judgment Day (2006 Extreme edition), Doctor Peter Silberman (Earl Boen)

Animation
Avatar: The Last Airbender (Iroh)
The Batman (Hugo Strange)

References

External links
Official profile

1948 births
Japanese male voice actors
Living people
Actors from Aichi Prefecture